Liv Strædet (born 21 October 1964 in Fredrikstad) is a former Norwegian football player who played for Norway women's national football team.

She played on the Norwegian team that won silver medals at the 1991 FIFA Women's World Cup in China.

References

1964 births
Living people
Norwegian women's footballers
Norway women's international footballers
1991 FIFA Women's World Cup players
SK Sprint-Jeløy (women) players
UEFA Women's Championship-winning players

Women's association football midfielders
Sportspeople from Fredrikstad